Essential S Club 7 is a greatest hits compilation album by British pop group S Club 7, released on 9 July 2021.

The 3xCD collection features tracks from across all four S Club 7 studio albums and all their singles, as well as a disc of remixes. The album debuted at number 35 on the UK Albums Chart.

Track listing

Charts

References

S Club 7 albums
2021 greatest hits albums